is a Japanese voice actor and live-action actor affiliated with 81 Produce. He frequently dubs character voices from English-speaking films into Japanese for the local market. He is known for his role as Grisha Jaeger in Attack on Titan (2013-present).

Filmography

Anime television
Naruto (2003) – Raido Namiashi
One Piece (2004) – Capote
Bobobo-bo Bo-bobo (2005) – Pana
Honey and Clover (2005) – Kazushi Yamazaki
The Wings of Rean (2005) – Rouri Yahan
Buso Renkin (2006) – Kinjo
Gintama (2007) – Marinosuke
Skull Man (2007) – Skullman
Soul Eater (2008) – Masamune Nakatsukasa
K-On! (2009) – Fuuma Monou
Needless (2009) – Zakard
Inazuma Eleven (2010) – Hidetoshi Nakata
Steins;Gate (2011) – John Titor
Bunny Drop (2011) – Daikichi Kawachi
Attack on Titan (2013) – Grisha Yeager
Pocket Monsters: XY (2013) – Dr. Platane (Professor Sycamore)
Buddy Complex (2014) – Dorzhiev (ep 6-7)
Tenkai Knights (2014) – Mr. Jones
Argevollen (2014) – Ukyō Samonji
Is It Wrong to Try to Pick Up Girls in a Dungeon? (2015) – Ganesha
Pocket Monsters: XY&Z (2015) – Dr. Platane (Professor Sycamore)
Fairy Tail (2015) – Ezel
Attack on Titan Season 3 (2018) – Grisha Jaeger
We Never Learn (2019) – Headmaster
Cautious Hero: The Hero Is Overpowered but Overly Cautious (2019) – Eraser Kaiser
Black Clover (2020) – Damnatio Kira
Attack on Titan Season 4 (2021) – Grisha Jaeger
Zombie Land Saga Revenge (2021) – Manager Nishimura
Tropical-Rouge! Pretty Cure (2021) – Connie
Platinum End (2022) – Masaya Hoshi

Theatrical animation
Apocalypse Meow (2010) – Sergeant Perkins
New Initial D the Movie: Legend 1 - Awakening (2014) – Koichiro Iketani
Blackfox (2019) – Allen

Web animation
Mobile Suit Gundam Thunderbolt (2015) – J.J. Sexton

Original video animation
Mobile Suit Gundam: The Witch from Mercury Prologue (2022) – Nadim Samaya

Video games
 Tekken 5 – Feng Wei
Atelier Iris 2: The Azoth of Destiny – Chaos
 Soulcalibur III – Zasalamel, Abyss
 Yakuza – Kazuki
Kingdom Hearts II – Tron
 Bleach the King of Fighters SuperNOVA – Fuuma Monou
 Yakuza 2 – Kazuki
 Tekken 6 – Feng Wei
 Soulcalibur IV – Zasalamel
 Yakuza 3 – Kazuki
Killzone 2 – Dante Garza
 Soulcalibur: Broken Destiny – Zasalamel
Solatorobo: Red The Hunter – Gren Sacher
 Tekken Tag Tournament 2 – Feng Wei
Ace Combat: Assault Horizon – William Bishop (Japanese dub)
 Soulcalibur V – Creation Male Reliable Leader
 Tekken 3D: Prime Edition – Feng Wei
 Dragon's Dogma: Dark Arisen – Maximilian
 Call of Duty: Ghosts – Keegan P. Russ
 Tekken 7 – Feng Wei
 Yakuza Kiwami – Kazuki
 Star Ocean: Integrity and Faithlessness – Gunter
 Nioh – Kuroda Nagamasa
 Yakuza Kiwami 2 – Kazuki
 Soulcalibur VI – Zasalamel

Live-action
Super Sentai World (1994) – NinjaBlue (voice)
Ninja Sentai Kakuranger (1994) – Saizo / NinjaBlue
Toei Hero Daishugō (1994) – NinjaBlue (voice)
Tokusou Sentai Dekaranger (2004) – Reversian Blitz Hells (ep. 21 - 23) (voice)
Mahou Sentai Magiranger (2005) – Hades Beastman Kirikage the Ninja (ep. 22) (voice)
Juuken Sentai Gekiranger (2007) – Confrontation Beast Mantis-Fist Makirika (ep. 1 - 2) (voice)
Samurai Sentai Shinkenger (2009) – Ayakashi Yanasudare (ep. 5) (voice)
Zyuden Sentai Kyoryuger (2013) – Debo Karyudosu (ep. 27 - 28) (voice)
Uchu Sentai Kyuranger (2017) – Tecchuu (eps. 23 - 25, 29 - 30)/Akyachuuga (co-voiced with: Naoya Uchida and Arisa Komiya) (ep. 42) (voice)
Ultraman Decker (2022) – HANE2 (voice)

Dubbing roles

Live-action
Joseph Gordon-Levitt
G.I. Joe: The Rise of Cobra – The Doctor/Rex
Inception – Arthur
The Dark Knight Rises – John Blake
Don Jon – Jon Martello
7500 – Tobias Ellis
Project Power – Frank Shaver
100 Things to Do Before High School – Jack Roberts (Jack De Sena)
11.22.63 – Jake Epping / James Amberson (James Franco)
15 Minutes of War – André Gerval (Alban Lenoir)
3 Idiots – Suhas Tandon (Olivier Sanjay Lafont)
The 33 – Minister Laurence Golborne (Rodrigo Santoro)
Absentia – Nick Durand (Patrick Heusinger)
Accident Man – Mike Fallon / Accident Man (Scott Adkins)
Agora – Orestes (Oscar Isaac)
Air – Bauer (Norman Reedus)
The Alamo – Juan Seguin (Jordi Mollà)
American Assassin – "Ghost" (Taylor Kitsch)
The Andromeda Strain – Dr. Tsi Chou (Daniel Dae Kim)
Armageddon (2004 NTV edition) – Oscar Choice (Owen Wilson)
Assassination Games – Roland Flint (Scott Adkins)
Battle of the Year – Jason Blake (Josh Holloway)
The Best of Me – Dawson Cole (James Marsden)
Billy Lynn's Long Halftime Walk – Staff Sgt. David Dime (Garrett Hedlund)
Bionic Woman – Jae Kim (Will Yun Lee)
Boardwalk Empire – Richard Harrow (Jack Huston)
Brothers – Capt. Sam Cahill (Tobey Maguire)
The Butterfly Effect 3: Revelations – Lonnie Flennons
The Captain – Kipinski (Frederick Lau)
Clerks – Randal Graves (Jeff Anderson)
Cold Case – Chris Lassing (Justin Chambers)
Crusader – Hank Robinson (Andrew McCarthy)
CSI: NY – Don Flack (Eddie Cahill)
The Dark Knight – The Chechen (Ritchie Coster)
Death at a Funeral – Justin (Ewen Bremner)
The Deuce – Vincent Martino (James Franco)
Disturbing the Peace – Marshall Jim Dillon (Guy Pearce)
Eli Stone – Eli Stone (Jonny Lee Miller)
Elysium – Max Da Costa (Matt Damon)
Faces in the Crowd – Bryce (Michael Shanks)
Fantastic Beasts and Where to Find Them – Henry Shaw, Jr. (Josh Cowdery)
Fast Food Nation – Pete (Ethan Hawke)
Fifty Shades Darker – Jack Hyde (Eric Johnson)
Fifty Shades Freed – Jack Hyde (Eric Johnson)
Fortitude – Sheriff Dan Anderssen (Richard Dormer)
Generation Um... – John (Keanu Reeves)
Grey's Anatomy – Alex Karev (Justin Chambers)
Grudge Match – B.J. (Jon Bernthal)
Guardians of the Galaxy – Kraglin (Sean Gunn)
Guardians of the Galaxy Vol. 2 – Kraglin (Sean Gunn)
The Guardians of the Galaxy Holiday Special – Kraglin (Sean Gunn)
Guardians of the Galaxy Vol. 3 – Kraglin (Sean Gunn)
Hard Target 2 – Wes Baylor (Scott Adkins)
Haywire – Aaron (Channing Tatum)
The Hurt Locker – Owen Eldridge (Brian Geraghty)
Incendiary – Lenny (Nicholas Gleaves)
Instinct – Ryan Stock (Travis Van Winkle)
Interstellar – Dr. Mann (Matt Damon)
Jay and Silent Bob Strike Back (Netflix edition) – Holden McNeil (Ben Affleck)
Jungle Cruise – Sancho (Dani Rovira)
The Kennedys – Joseph P. Kennedy, Jr. (Gabriel Hogan)
King Arthur: Legend of the Sword – King Arthur (Charlie Hunnam)
Kung Fu Yoga – Jones Lee (Aarif Rahman)
Life of Pi – The Writer (Rafe Spall)
The Lord of the Rings: The Rings of Power – Stranger (Daniel Weyman)
MacGyver – Jack Dalton (George Eads)
Miracle – Jim Craig (Eddie Cahill)
Munich – Steve (Daniel Craig)
My Way – Claude François (Jérémie Renier)
Need for Speed – Dino Brewster (Dominic Cooper)
The Next Best Thing – Kevin Lasater (Michael Vartan)
Once Upon a Time – Captain Killian "Hook" Jones (Colin O'Donoghue)
The Originals – Klaus Mikaelson (Joseph Morgan)
The Pacific – GySgt. John Basilone (Jon Seda)
Pacific Rim – Yancy Becket (Diego Klattenhoff)
Pirates of the Caribbean: On Stranger Tides – King Ferdinand (Sebastian Armesto)
Power Rangers Lost Galaxy – Mike Corbett/Magna Defender (Russell Lawrence), Auctioneer (Michael Sorich)
Power Rangers Lightspeed Rescue – Triskull (Michael Sorich)
The Proposal – Andrew Paxton (Ryan Reynolds)
Quarantine – Jake (Jay Hernandez)
REC 3: Genesis – Koldo (Diego Martin)
Red Dawn – Jed Eckert (Chris Hemsworth)
Red Water – Brett van Ryan (Langley Kirkwood)
Roman J. Israel, Esq. – George Pierce (Colin Farrell)
S. Darko – Randy Holt (Ed Westwick)
Scary Movie 3 - Ross Giggins (Jeremy Piven)
Secretariat – Seth Hancock (Drew Roy)
Seven Psychopaths – Martin "Marty" Faranan (Colin Farrell)
Shorts – Mr. Bill Thompson (Jon Cryer)
Snowpiercer – Curtis Everett (Chris Evans)
Source Code – Derek Frost (Michael Arden)
Space Jam: A New Legacy – Malik (Khris Davis)
Squid Game – Hwang In-ho (Lee Byung-hun)
Street Kings – Detective Paul Diskant (Chris Evans)
Tears of the Sun – James "Red" Atkins (Cole Hauser)
Thor: Love and Thunder – Kraglin (Sean Gunn)
Tomb Raider – Bill (Billy Postlethwaite)
Torque – Val (Will Yun Lee)
Total Recall – Marek (Will Yun Lee)
The Town – Douglas "Doug" MacRay (Ben Affleck)
Transformers: Age of Extinction – Cade Yeager (Mark Wahlberg)
Transformers: The Last Knight – Cade Yeager (Mark Wahlberg)
Tron – Alan Bradley (Bruce Boxleitner)
Tron: Legacy – Edward Dillinger, Jr. (Cillian Murphy)
Unbroken – Mutsuhiro "The Bird" Watanabe (Miyavi)
Universal Soldier: Day of Reckoning – John (Scott Adkins)
Valkyrie – Lieutenant Werner von Haeften (Jamie Parker)
The Walking Dead – Rick Grimes (Andrew Lincoln)
Warcraft – Anduin Lothar (Travis Fimmel)
Warrior – Tommy Riordan Conlon (Tom Hardy)
Welcome to the Jungle – Phil (Rob Huebel)
Wrath of the Titans – Ares (Édgar Ramírez)
Vice – Evan (Bryan Greenberg)

Animation
Cars – Lightning McQueen
Cars 2 – Lightning McQueen
Cars 3 – Lightning McQueen
Minions: The Rise of Gru – Dr. Nefario
Teenage Mutant Ninja Turtles (2012 TV series) – Donatello
Thomas & Friends – Stanley

References

External links
Hiroshi Tsuchida at 81 Produce

1972 births
81 Produce voice actors
Living people
Japanese male video game actors
Japanese male voice actors
Male voice actors from Tokyo
20th-century Japanese male actors
21st-century Japanese male actors